Daljit Nagra  (born 1966) is a British poet whose debut collection, Look We Have Coming to Dover! – a title alluding to W. H. Auden's Look, Stranger!, D. H. Lawrence's Look! We Have Come Through! and by epigraph also to Matthew Arnold's "Dover Beach" – was published by Faber in February 2007. Nagra's poems relate to the experience of Indians born in the UK (especially Indian Sikhs), and often employ language that imitates the English spoken by Indian immigrants whose first language is Punjabi, which some have termed "Punglish". He currently works part-time at JFS School in Kenton and visits schools, universities and festivals where he performs his work. He was appointed chair of the Royal Society of Literature in November 2020.

Early life and education
Daljit Nagra, whose Sikh Punjabi parents came to Britain from India in the late 1950s, was born and grew up in Yiewsley, near London's Heathrow Airport, the family moving to Sheffield in 1982. In 1988 he went to study for a BA and MA in English at Royal Holloway, University of London. Tentatively beginning to write, he later attended poetry workshops, courses and tutorials, receiving feedback from poets including Pascale Petit, Moniza Alvi, John Stammers, Carol Ann Duffy and Jackie Kay, and from 2002 being mentored by Stephen Knights.

Poetry career
In 2003, Nagra won the Smith/Doorstop Books Pamphlet Competition, leading to the subsequent publication of his Oh MY Rub!, which was the Poetry Book Society's first ever PBS Pamphlet Choice. In 2004 Nagra won the Forward Poetry Prize for best single poem for "Look We Have Coming to Dover!". Nagra's debut book-length collection, which takes the same title, was published in 2007, when it received extremely positive reviews and was featured on television and radio, including the prominent BBC programme Newsnight Review. Look We Have Coming to Dover! won the 2007 Forward Poetry Prize for best first collection, the South Bank Show Decibel Award and was nominated for the Costa Poetry Award, the Guardian First Book Award, the Aldeburgh Prize and the Glen Dimplex Award.

His second collection, Tippoo Sultan's Incredible White-Man Eating Tiger-Toy Machine!!! (2012), was shortlisted for the T. S. Eliot Prize. Nagra's 2013 book, Ramayana, was also shortlisted for the T. S. Eliot Prize. In 2014 he won the Royal Society of Authors Travelling Scholarship Award.

His poems have been published in the New Yorker, Atlantic Review, The London Review of Books, The Times Literary Supplement, Poetry Review, Poetry London, Poetry International, The Rialto and The North.

He has performed at venues located in places such as Banff, Calgary, Toronto, Bratislava, Galle, Mumbai, Delhi, Orkney, Belfast, Dublin, Rotterdam, Amsterdam, Heidelberg, St Andrews, Edinburgh, Ty Newydd and many places in England.

Nagra has been on the Board of the Poetry Book Society and the Poetry Archive. He has judged the 2008 Samuel Johnson Prize, the Guardian First Book Award 2008, the Foyle Young Poets of the Year Award 2008, the National Poetry Competition 2009, the 2010 Manchester Poetry Prize. and the Costa Book Award poetry category and overall winner in 2012. He has also hosted the T. S. Eliot Poetry Readings 2009. He was the Keats House Poet-In-Residence from July 2014 to June 2015, and he was an Eton College Wisdom Scholar in November 2014.

Nagra has acted as the Lead Poetry Tutor at the Faber Academy and has run workshops all over the world. He is a regular contributor to BBC radio, and in October 2015, he became the first poet in residence for BBC Radio 4. He was succeeded in this role by Alice Oswald. Nagra has written articles for The Financial Times, The Guardian, The Observer, The Times of India. He teaches English at Brunel University.

In 2017 he was elected a Fellow of the Royal Society of Literature.

His poem "Singh Song!" was added to the AQA English Literature GCSE love and relationships poetry specification.

Nagra was appointed chair of the Royal Society of Literature in November 2020, taking over from Lisa Appignanesi, who had held the position since 2016.

Nagra was appointed Member of the Order of the British Empire (MBE) in the 2022 Birthday Honours for services to literature.

Personal life
Nagra married a woman he met at university, not long after they graduated. Although the marriage produced a daughter, it was not successful and the couple divorced, at Nagra's behest. Subsequently, Nagra met and married his current wife Katherine, with whom he has two daughters, Maia and Hannah. During the 2000s they lived in Dollis Hill before moving to Harrow in the 2010s.

Bibliography
 Oh MY Rub! – Smith/Doorstop, 2003. 
 Look We Have Coming to Dover! – Faber & Faber, 2007. 
 Tippoo Sultan's Incredible White-Man-Eating Tiger Toy-Machine!!! – Faber & Faber, 2012. 
 Ramayana – Faber & Faber, 2013.  (hardback);  (paperback).
 "British Museum" – Faber & Faber, 2017.  (hardback)

Interviews

References

External links

Daljit Nagra's entry on the British Council's Contemporary Writers website. Retrieved 19 March 2008
Daljit Nagra, "Look we have coming to Dover!", The Guardian, 26 July 2004. Retrieved 20 January 2007
Jon Stone, An Interview with Daljit Nagra, Roundtable Review, edition 4, January–February 2006. Retrieved 30 August 2007
Daljit Nagra official website, 19 November 2007, created by Kuldip Sodera, tetra interactive

Look We Have Coming to Dover! Poem Analysis and Commentary

1966 births
Living people
Writers from Sheffield
21st-century English poets
21st-century English male writers
English people of Punjabi descent
English male poets
Alumni of Royal Holloway, University of London
Date of birth missing (living people)
Fellows of the Royal Society of Literature
Members of the Order of the British Empire
People from the London Borough of Hillingdon
Writers from London